Käsebier is a surname of German origin. Notable people with the surname include:

Gertrude Käsebier (1852–1934), American photographer
Dirk Käsebier (born 1966), German boxer

See also
Nate Kazebier (1912–1969), American jazz musician

Surnames of German origin